Hexoplon annulatum is a species of beetle in the family Cerambycidae. It was described by Martins and Galileo in 2011.

References

Hexoplonini
Beetles described in 2011